María Teresa Torró Flor won the event in 2012 but chose to compete at the 2013 Gastein Ladies instead of defending her title.

Polona Hercog won the title, defeating Katarzyna Piter in the final, 6–0, 6–3.

Seeds

Main draw

Finals

Top half

Bottom half

References 
 Main draw

ITS Cup - Singles
ITS Cup